Locomotives 9 and 10 of the Lokalbahn AG (LAG) were saturated steam locomotives that were built for the Murnau - Garmisch-Partenkirchen route opened in 1889. 

These locomotives were supplied by Krauss and were similar to the Bavarian D VII (Bayerische D VII) engines, but they had smaller coupled wheels and a larger heating and grate area. 

In 1908 the Royal Bavarian State Railways (Königlich Bayerische Staatsbahn) purchased the line and the two locomotives with it. They were operated as the Bavarian Class PtL 3/3 and were given the numbers 1875 and 1876. 

In 1925 the Deutsche Reichsbahn-Gesellschaft took over both engines as the DRG Class 98.76 (Baureihe 98.76), but had retired them by 1927.

See also 
 Royal Bavarian State Railways
 Lokalbahn AG
 List of Bavarian locomotives and railbuses

References

0-6-0T locomotives
Locomotives of Bavaria
Standard gauge locomotives of Germany
Krauss locomotives
Railway locomotives introduced in 1889
C n2t locomotives
Freight locomotives